Paul Earnest Selge (August 4, 1921 – April 20, 2016) was an American football player and coach. He served as the head football coach at Indiana State University in Terre Haute, Indiana in 1955, compiling a record of 2–6. He was a star football and basketball player at Indiana State as a student from 1939 until 1943.

Head coaching record

References

1921 births
2016 deaths
Indiana State Sycamores football coaches
Indiana State Sycamores football players
Indiana State Sycamores men's basketball players
People from South Bend, Indiana
Players of American football from Indiana